Hamaas Abdul Khaalis (1921 – November 13, 2003), born Ernest Timothy McGhee, also known as Ernest "XX" McGee and Ernest 2X McGee, was leader of the Hanafi Movement, a Black Muslim group based in Washington, D.C. subscribing to the Hanafi school of Sunni Islam. To draw attention to the 1973 murder of his family he organised a 1977 siege of Washington, D.C. in which two of 149 hostages died.

He spent the rest of his life in prison after being found guilty of conspiracy to commit kidnapping while armed, second-degree murder, two counts of assault with intent to kill while armed, one count of assault with a dangerous weapon, and 24 counts of kidnapping while armed.

Early life 

Khaalis was born to Seventh-day Adventist parents in Gary, Indiana as Ernest Timothy McGhee. He graduated 22nd in a class of 135 at Roosevelt High School, and he played percussion instruments and eventually converted to Roman Catholicism.

As McGee, he attended Purdue University and Mid-Western Conservatory. He was discharged from the U.S. Army on grounds of mental instability. He was a talented jazz drummer and played with Bud Powell, Charlie Parker, Max Roach, Billie Holiday, and J.J. Johnson in New York City.

Hanafi Movement
Khaalis met Tasibur Uddein Rahman and converted to Sunni Islam. Upon advice of his instructor, he infiltrated the Nation of Islam (NOI). In 1954, at the suggestion of Malcolm X, Elijah Muhammad named Khaalis the National Secretary of the NOI, a position he held until 1957. Muhammad also sent him to Chicago to head the University of Islam. In an interview, Khaalis said, "Elijah once said that I was next in line to him, that it was me, not Malcolm X."

Khaalis split with the Nation of Islam in 1958 to found a rival Islamic organisation, the Hanafi Movement. In 1968, he was arrested for attempted extortion but released on grounds of mental illness. The same year,  militant blacks at Howard University formed a group called the Kokayi family. When that group was disbanded, many of its members became members of Hamaas' Hanafi American Mussulman's Rifle and Pistol Club, which was given a group membership charter by the National Rifle Association.

In 1971, Khaalis converted basketball player Lew Alcindor to Islam; after his conversion, Alcindor adopted the name Kareem Abdul-Jabbar. Abdul-Jabbar donated a fieldstone mansion, 7700 16th Street NW, to serve as the headquarters of Khaalis' organization in Washington, D.C.

Feud with Nation of Islam

In 1972, Khaalis circulated an open letter that referred to Elijah Muhammad as a "lying deceiver" and asserted that he lured "former dope addicts and prostitutes to monk-like lives of sacrifice" that would "lead them to hell."

Khaalis claimed credit for Malcolm X's leaving the Nation of Islam. In a 1973 interview, Khaalis said he was teaching Malcolm X about Sunni Islam. "He used to come to my house on Long Island and we would sit in his car for hours. He would meet me after he left the temple. Never in public because he knew they were after him. He was saying the wrong things."

Murder of his family

On January 18, 1973, Khaalis' family was murdered inside their Washington D.C home, in retaliation for letters that Khaalis had written against the Nation of Islam.

Hanafi Siege

To bring attention to his family's murder, Khaalis planned and led the 1977 Hanafi Siege. He was tried and convicted, receiving a sentence of 21 to 120 years in prison.

Death 

Khaalis died at the Federal Correctional Complex Prison in Butner, North Carolina, on November 13, 2003.

See also 
 1973 New York City hostage incident
 Wallace Fard Muhammad
 Dawud Salahuddin

Published works 

 "Look and See The Key to Knowing and Understanding – Self-Identity, Self-Culture and Self-Heritage" A.S.F.M.I., 1972.

References 

Malcolm X
2003 deaths
1921 births
African-American activists
African-American former Christians
African-American Muslims
American former Protestants
American Sunni Muslims
Former Roman Catholics
Former Seventh-day Adventists
Former Nation of Islam members
Converts to Sunni Islam from Catholicism
American pan-Africanists
Racism in the United States
Sunni Islamists
Nation of Islam religious leaders
American Muslim activists